The 2023 NASCAR Xfinity Series is the 42nd season of the NASCAR Xfinity Series, a stock car racing series sanctioned by NASCAR in the United States. The season started with the Beef. It's What's for Dinner. 300 on February 18 at Daytona International Speedway and will end with the NASCAR Xfinity Series Championship Race on November 4 at Phoenix Raceway.

Ty Gibbs enters the season as the defending Xfinity Series champion although he will not compete for a second straight championship as he will move up to the Cup Series in 2023 to drive full-time for Joe Gibbs Racing, replacing Kyle Busch.

Teams and drivers

Complete schedule

Limited schedule

Notes

Confirmed changes

Teams
 On July 14, 2022, Emerling-Gase Motorsports announced that they would expand to two full-time cars, with the No. 53, previously a part-time car, running full-time in 2023. One car would have one full-time driver with multiple drivers sharing the other car. On February 2, 2023, the team announced that the No. 53 car would be driven by team co-owners Joey Gase and Patrick Emerling (as well as previously announced part-time drivers Brad Perez and C. J. McLaughlin), making the No. 35 car the car that will have one full-time driver.
 On August 25, 2022, Front Row Motorsports announced that Zane Smith, who drives for the team full-time in the Truck Series, would run part-time for a Ford team in the Xfinity Series with entries being fielded in a collaboration with them (instead of FRM starting their own Xfinity Series team).
 On September 20, 2022, JD Motorsports announced that they would expand to three full-time Xfinity Series cars in 2023. The team downsized from four full-time cars to two in 2022.
 On October 7, 2022, it was announced that Truck and ARCA Series team AM Racing, owned by driver Austin Wayne Self, would expand into the Xfinity Series in 2023. The team's car number, driver(s), sponsors and crew chief have all yet to be announced. The team will attempt to qualify for the season-opener at Daytona.
 On October 26, 2022, Jesse Iwuji stated in an interview with Dustin Albino from Jayski that he would like to expand his team to two full-time cars in 2023 if sponsorship can be found for a second car. However, on February 17, 2023, Kyle Weatherman, who drove for the team in 2023, revealed to TobyChristie.com that JIM would not field a second car and would also be cutting back their one car, the No. 34, to part-time in 2023 amidst the team's sponsorship struggles following the loss of the No. 34 car's primary sponsor, Equity Prime Mortgage, in a lawsuit and legal battle.
 On November 5, 2022, Mike Harmon Racing announced that Gary Keller would join the team as a co-owner after having been a co-owner of JD Motorsports from 2012 to 2022. The team will be back in the Xfinity Series in 2023 although they have yet to announce their 2023 plans. On December 19, Brandon Kauffman, the team's PR & Marketing Assistant, teased on the NASCAR Reddit page that the team would field the No. 74 car again in 2023. In 2022, MHR only fielded that car in the season-opener at Daytona when it had run full-time for several years prior. On January 13, 2023, the team announced that they would be renaming to CHK Racing after the addition of another co-owner, Michael Clayton Sr, as well as to reflect Keller's new co-ownership of the team. The No. 74 car will be fielded full-time while the No. 47 car will be fielded part-time.
 On November 16, 2022, Stewart-Haas Racing announced that they would be expanding to two full-time Xfinity Series cars in 2023. The second car will be driven by Cole Custer, who is moving back to the Xfinity Series after three years driving the team's No. 41 Cup Series car. On November 23, it was revealed that Custer would drive the No. 00, the same car number SHR used when they last fielded a second Xfinity Series car and Custer was the driver.
 On December 8, 2022, Joe Gibbs Racing announced that their No. 54 car would be renumbered to the No. 20 in 2023. JGR did not use that number in 2022 after downsizing from four full-time Xfinity Series cars to three and the No. 20 car was the car that closed down.
 On December 8, 2022, Sam Hunt Racing announced that they would expand to two full-time cars in 2023, with their No. 24 car now being fielded full-time after having been fielded part-time in 2021 and 2022.
 On December 20, 2022, Alpha Prime Racing announced that they would expand to three full-time cars in 2023. Their new third car, the No. 43, will be driven by Ryan Ellis in 24 races with the driver(s) for the remaining 9 races to be announced at a later time. On March 13, 2023, it was revealed on the entry list for the race at Atlanta that APR would field a fourth car, the No. 42, in that race to be driven by team owner Caesar Bacarella. However, the car would be withdrawn and Bacarella would instead replace Timmy Hill in the No. 66 car for MBM Motorsports with the entry being fielded in a collaboration with APR.
 On January 4, 2023, Jordan Anderson Racing announced that they would expand to two full-time cars in 2023. The second car will be the No. 27 driven by Jeb Burton. He used the same number in 2022 driving full-time for Our Motorsports.
 On February 18, 2023, MBM Motorsports announced it will scale back to one full-time team. The No. 66 will remain as the full-time entry while plans for the No. 13 are yet to be determined after Daytona.
 On March 3, 2023, Preston Pardus announced that he would return to driving for his own team in the Xfinity Series, which he last did in 2019. That year, the team was known as Pardus Racing Inc. However, "Inc." is no longer a part of the re-started Pardus family team's name and the No. 43, which the team used in 2019, was taken by Alpha Prime Racing starting in 2023, so the team switched to the No. 50, a number that Pardus' father Dan used in the Cup Series in 1999 driving for Midwest Transit Racing. The first Xfinity Series race Preston and his team will run in 2023 is Circuit of the Americas.
 On March 7, 2023, Cup and Truck Series team Spire Motorsports announced that they would expand into the Xfinity Series in 2023, fielding the No. 77 car part-time for Carson Hocevar, who drives full-time in the Truck Series for Niece Motorsports. It will be Hocevar's Xfinity Series debut. This also makes Spire the only team to field entries in all three NASCAR national series in 2023.

Drivers
 On August 10, 2022, it was announced that Noah Gragson, who drove the JR Motorsports No. 9 car full-time for four years from 2019 to 2022, would move up to the Cup Series full-time in 2023, driving the Petty GMS Motorsports No. 42. On September 15, JRM announced that Brandon Jones would leave Joe Gibbs Racing and move to JRM to replace Gragson in the No. 9 car.
 On September 26, 2022, NASCAR YouTuber Casey Campbell revealed that Brandon Brown told him that he would not return to his family-owned team Brandonbilt Motorsports in their No. 68 car in 2023.
 On October 5, 2022, Kaulig Racing announced that Chandler Smith, who has driven full-time in the Truck Series in the No. 18 for Kyle Busch Motorsports for the last two years, would replace A. J. Allmendinger in the No. 16 in 2023, as Allmendinger would return to the Cup Series to drive the team's No. 16 car full-time.
 On October 28, 2022, Jeb Burton announced he would be leaving Our Motorsports at the end of the 2022 season.
 On October 29, 2022, Big Machine Racing announced that Parker Kligerman, a NASCAR on NBC pit reporter and part-time driver, would drive their No. 48 car full-time in 2023. It will be Kligerman's first full-time season since 2013.
 On October 30, 2022, Corazón de F1 reported that open wheel driver Baltazar Leguizamón had obtained a license to drive in the Xfinity Series and he could attempt some of the road course races in 2023. He would become the first driver from Argentina to compete in the series. On December 23, MBM Motorsports announced that Leguizamón would drive for the team in the race at Circuit of the Americas in 2023 once they find a sponsor for him.
 On October 31, 2022, Ryan Vargas announced that he would not return to JD Motorsports in 2023. He drove the team's No. 6 for the majority of the 2021 and 2022 seasons. On December 2, JDM announced Brennan Poole as Vargas' replacement in the No. 6.
 On November 1, 2022, B. J. McLeod Motorsports announced that Garrett Smithley would drive the team's No. 78 car full-time in 2023. He drove that car as well as the team's No. 5 car part-time in the Xfinity Series in 2022. On January 7, 2023, the team announced that the car would be renumbered from the No. 78 to the No. 99. After Smithley and the No. 99 car failed to qualify for two of the first three races of the season, the car was withdrawn from the race at Phoenix in March and Smithley instead drove the No. 91 car for DGM Racing in that race. On March 13, 2023, an article on TobyChristie.com stated that Bayley Currey would be replaced in the JD Motorsports No. 4 car starting at Atlanta in March by Garrett Smithley for 14 races and other driver(s) for the remaining 15 races according to a crew member from the team who requested anonymity. Another anonymous crew member told the website that Smithley would run the remainder of the season in the No. 4 car. The next day, JDM officially announced that Smithley would drive the No. 4 car for the rest of the year, replacing Currey. He previously drove full-time for the team from 2016 to 2019, primarily in their No. 0 car.
 On November 15, 2022, Joe Gibbs Racing announced that Ty Gibbs would move up to the Cup Series full-time for the team in 2023, replacing Kyle Busch in the renumbered No. 54 car (previously the No. 18). On December 8, JGR announced that John Hunter Nemechek would drive the renumbered No. 20 full-time in 2023. In 2021 and 2022, Nemechek drove full-time for Kyle Busch Motorsports in the Truck Series and part-time for JGR in the Xfinity Series.
 On November 16, 2022, Stewart-Haas Racing announced that Cole Custer will move back to the Xfinity Series after three seasons in the Cup Series. He will drive a second full-time Xfinity Series car for the team. On November 23, SHR posted a video on their Twitter account revealing that Custer would drive the No. 00, the same number he used when he ran full-time in the Xfinity Series for the team from 2017 to 2019.
 On December 8, 2022, Joe Gibbs Racing announced that their No. 19 car, previously driven full-time by Brandon Jones (who left to drive the JRM No. 9 car), would have multiple drivers sharing the car throughout the season instead of the No. 18 car, which will now be driven full-time by Sammy Smith. Ryan Truex, who was one of the drivers of the No. 18 in 2022, will continue driving part-time for JGR in 2023 in the No. 19 car. The rest of the driver lineup for the No. 19 car has yet to be announced.
 On December 8, 2022, Sam Hunt Racing announced that Kaz Grala would drive their No. 26 car full-time in 2023. It is the first time that car has had one driver for the full season as well as Grala's first full-time ride in NASCAR since 2017 when he drove for GMS Racing in the Truck Series. Grala drove the same car in the 2022 season-finale at Phoenix after driving for multiple other teams part-time in 2022 in the Cup, Xfinity and Truck Series.
 On December 8, 2022, Sam Hunt Racing announced that Connor Mosack would drive their No. 24 car part-time in 2023. In 2022, he drove one race for the team in their No. 26 car at Watkins Glen as well as Joe Gibbs Racing's No. 18 car at Portland. Mosack also drove part-time for Bret Holmes Racing in the Truck and ARCA Series in 2022. On January 23, 2023, SHR announced that Tyler Reddick would drive the No. 24 in select races starting with Fontana.
 On December 12, 2022, AM Racing announced that Brett Moffitt would drive the No. 25 in 2023.
 On December 13, 2022, Alpha Prime Racing announced that Jeffrey Earnhardt would drive their No. 44 car full-time in 2023. He drove part-time for Sam Hunt Racing, Emerling-Gase Motorsports and Richard Childress Racing in 2022.
 On December 23, 2022, SS-Green Light Racing owner Bobby Dotter stated in a video on the team's Twitter account that Joe Graf Jr. would not be back with SSGLR in 2023 and that the team will have new drivers for their cars in 2023. On January 9, 2023, the team announced that Blaine Perkins, who drove full-time for CR7 Motorsports full-time in the Truck Series in 2022 and for Our Motorsports part-time in the Xfinity Series in 2021 and 2022, would drive their No. 07 car full-time in 2023.
 On December 30, 2022, Alpha Prime Racing announced that Leland Honeyman would drive their No. 45 car part-time in 2023. He drove for Young's Motorsports full-time in the ARCA Menards Series East and part-time in the main ARCA Series and the Truck Series in 2022.
 On January 4, 2023, Jordan Anderson Racing announced that they would have two new full-time drivers in 2023. Jeb Burton will drive the No. 27 car, a new second full-time car for the team, and Parker Retzlaff will replace Myatt Snider in their No. 31 car. On February 8, 2023, it was announced that Snider would drive the JGR No. 19 car part-time.
 On January 18, 2023, Landon Cassill tweeted that he would not be returning to the Kaulig Racing No. 10 car in 2023 as a result of his sponsor Voyager Digital filing for bankruptcy in July 2022. On February 9, A. J. Allmendinger announced he would drive the No. 10 at COTA. The next day, Kyle Busch announced he would drive the No. 10 for five races, ending his retirement in the Xfinity Series after scoring a total of 102 wins in 2021. As Allmendinger and Busch are full-time Cup drivers, they are allowed to run up to five races in the Xfinity Series.
 On January 27, 2023, it was announced that Joe Graf Jr. would drive at least 28 races for RSS Racing in 2023. He previously drove the majority of the 2022 season for SS-Green Light Racing as well as 1 race for RSS in their No. 38 car, replacing Timmy Hill in that car after he failed to qualify the SSGLR No. 08 into the race at Fontana. Graf Jr. will drive the other five races in the No. 19 Toyota Supra for Joe Gibbs Racing.
 On February 8, 2023, it was announced that Natalie Decker would drive part-time for Emerling-Gase Motorsports in the Xfinity Series and the ARCA Menards Series in their No. 53 car in both series.
 On February 18, 2023, Alex Labbé revealed that he would drive the No. 28 car for RSS Racing at Fontana and Las Vegas, filling in for Joe Graf Jr. who will drive the Joe Gibbs Racing No. 19 car in those two races. Kyle Sieg will move from the No. 28 car to replace Graf in the No. 38 car for these two races. It is the first time Labbé has driven for a team other than DGM Racing in the Xfinity Series.
 On February 24, 2023, it was announced that Mason Maggio would make his Xfinity Series debut in the race at Las Vegas in March driving the No. 66 car for MBM Motorsports. He ran part-time in the Truck Series for Reaume Brothers Racing and Peck Motorsports in 2022.
 On March 13, 2023, it was announced that Chad Chastain would make his Xfinity Series debut in the race at Atlanta in March driving the No. 91 car for DGM Racing. His brother Ross drove the same car at Fontana three weeks prior. Chad has driven part-time in the Truck Series for Niece Motorsports since 2021.

Crew chiefs
 On September 1, 2022, JR Motorsports announced that Mike Bumgarner, who was the crew chief of the team's No. 8 car driven by Josh Berry in 2022, would be the team's new competition director. On November 17, JRM announced that Bumgarner would be replaced by Taylor Moyer, who crew chiefed the team's No. 1 car driven by Sam Mayer in 2022. Moyer previously crew chiefed the No. 8 car from 2019 to 2021.
 On October 8, 2022, NASCAR on NBC pit reporter Marty Snider stated during a caution during the 2022 race at the Charlotte Roval that Kevin Starland, the crew chief of Ryan Sieg's No. 39 car for RSS Racing, would retire after the 2022 season. On February 5, 2023, RSS announced that Mike Scearce would be the new crew chief of the No. 39 car in 2023.
 On October 25, 2022, it was announced that Luke Lambert, who was the crew chief of the JR Motorsports No. 9 car driven by Noah Gragson in 2022, would move with Gragson to the Petty GMS Motorsports No. 42 car in the Cup Series in 2023. On November 17, JRM announced that Lambert would be replaced by Jason Burdett, who crew chiefed the team's No. 7 car from 2015 to 2022, working with Regan Smith for the first year and Justin Allgaier for the other seven. The No. 9 car will now be driven by Brandon Jones.
 On November 15, 2022, Joe Gibbs Racing announced that Chris Gayle, who crew chiefed their No. 54 car in the Xfinity Series in 2021 and 2022, would move back up to the Cup Series full-time for the team in 2023, replacing Ben Beshore as the crew chief of the renumbered No. 54 car (previously the No. 18 driven by Kyle Busch) and continuing to work with Ty Gibbs. On December 8, JGR announced that Beshore would move down to the Xfinity Series, replacing Gayle as the crew chief of the team's renumbered No. 20 car, now driven by John Hunter Nemechek.
 On November 17, 2022, JR Motorsports announced that Jim Pohlman would be the new crew chief for Justin Allgaier's No. 7 car in 2023, replacing Jason Burdett, who moved to JRM's No. 9 car driven by Brandon Jones. In 2022, Pohlman was a mechanic and an interim crew chief for Richard Childress Racing in the Cup and Xfinity Series. He was also the crew chief for Allgaier when he won the 2008 ARCA Re/Max Series championship.
 On November 17, 2022, JR Motorsports announced that Mardy Lindley would be the new crew chief for Sam Mayer's No. 1 car in 2023, replacing Taylor Moyer, who moved to JRM's No. 8 car driven by Josh Berry. Lindley was the crew chief of the No. 51 Kyle Busch Motorsports truck in 2021 and 2022. Prior to that, he was the crew chief for Mayer in ARCA with GMS Racing. Lindley and Mayer won two consecutive East Series championships in 2019 and 2020.
 On December 6, 2022, it was announced that Chad Walter, who was the crew chief of the No. 27 Our Motorsports car driven by Jeb Burton in 2022, would be leaving for GMS Racing to crew chief the team's No. 24 truck driven by Rajah Caruth in the Truck Series in 2023. Walter is returning to GMS after having crew chiefed for the team in 2020 and 2021. His replacement as crew chief of the Our Motorsports No. 27 car has yet to be announced.
 On December 6, 2022, Joe Gibbs Racing announced that Jeff Meendering, who was the crew chief of their No. 19 car driven by Brandon Jones from 2019 to 2022, would be the crew chief for their No. 18 car in 2023, replacing Jason Ratcliff. On December 8, JGR announced that Ratcliff would crew chief the No. 19 car in 2023, switching cars with Meendering. Sammy Smith will drive the No. 18 car full-time in 2023 after he and other drivers shared that car part-time in 2022. The No. 19 car will be the JGR car that has multiple part-time drivers in 2023 and Ratcliff will continue to crew chief them.
 On December 8, 2022, Sam Hunt Racing announced that Kris Bowen, who was the crew chief of the No. 02 Our Motorsports car in 2022, would be the crew chief of their No. 24 car in 2023. The No. 24 was a part-time car in 2022 and will be a full-time car in 2023. Bowen's replacement as crew chief of the Our Motorsports No. 02 car has yet to be announced.
 On January 6, 2023, Stewart-Haas Racing announced that Jonathan Toney, a longtime engineer for the team dating back to when the team was Haas CNC Racing, would be the crew chief of their No. 00 car driven by Cole Custer in 2023.
 On January 9, 2023, SS-Green Light Racing announced that Mike Hillman Sr. would be the crew chief of their No. 07 car in 2023, replacing Joe Williams Jr. Hillman Sr. started 2022 as the crew chief of the Rick Ware Racing No. 15 car in the Cup Series before leaving for David Gilliland Racing in the Truck Series, and then crew chiefing for Emerling-Gase Motorsports, DGM Racing and Bassett Racing in the Xfinity Series during parts of the season.
 On January 9, 2023, AM Racing announced that Joe Williams Jr. would be the crew chief of the No. 25 car driven by Brett Moffitt in 2023.
 On February 2, 2023, Big Machine Racing announced that Chris Carrier, who was previously the crew chief of the Henderson Motorsports No. 75 in the Truck Series, would crew chief their new part-time second car, the No. 5 driven by Jade Buford.
 On February 5, 2023, RSS Racing announced that Brad Parrott, who crew chiefed the No. 6 Rev Racing ARCA car driven by Rajah Caruth for part of 2022, would be the new crew chief of their No. 28 car which returns to running full-time in 2023. Parrott previously crew chiefed in the Xfinity Series from 2002 to 2013 for Roush Racing, Chip Ganassi Racing, RAB Racing, Rusty Wallace Racing, JD Motorsports, MAKE Motorsports, Tommy Baldwin Racing and TeamSLR.

Manufacturers
 On December 12, 2022, AM Racing announced it would switch from Chevrolet to Ford in 2023, with a technical alliance with Stewart-Haas Racing.
 On January 9, 2023, SS-Green Light Racing announced that they would be switching from Ford with a Stewart-Haas Racing alliance to Chevrolet with a Richard Childress Racing alliance for 2023. However, team owner Bobby Dotter told Jayski that the team's No. 08 may run a mixture of Chevrolets and Fords in 2023.

Sponsorship
 On November 1, 2022, JR Motorsports announced that Bass Pro Shops, which previously sponsored Noah Gragson's No. 9 car for the team, would switch their sponsorship to Josh Berry's No. 8 car in 2023 and would sponsor him in 11 races. They will also sponsor one of two races that team owner Dale Earnhardt Jr. will run in the No. 88 car in 2023.
 On December 7, 2022, Jesse Iwuji Motorsports filed a lawsuit against their primary sponsor of the No. 34 car in 2022, Equity Prime Mortgage, for lack of payments to the team. This would be followed by EPM filing a counter-lawsuit against JIM for breach of contract. As a result of the loss of EPM as a sponsor, the team had to reduce their No. 34 car to a part-time schedule in 2023 and cancel plans to expand to a second car.
 On February 2, 2023, Emerling-Gase Motorsports announced that the National Crime Prevention Council would sponsor their No. 53 car in the season-opener at Daytona. The paint scheme will feature their mascot, McGruff the Crime Dog.

Schedule
The entire schedule was released on September 14, 2022.

Note: Race names and title sponsors are subject to change. Not all title sponsors/names of races have been announced for 2023. For the races where a 2023 name and title sponsor has yet to be announced, the title sponsors/names of those races in 2022 are listed.

Results and standings

Race results

Drivers' championship

(key) Bold – Pole position awarded by time. Italics – Pole position set by final practice results or owner's points. * – Most laps led. 1 – Stage 1 winner. 2 – Stage 2 winner.

Owners' championship (Top 15)
(key) Bold – Pole position awarded by time. Italics – Pole position set by final practice results or owner's points. * – Most laps led. 1 – Stage 1 winner. 2 – Stage 2 winner

Manufacturers' championship
After 5 of 33 races

See also
 2023 NASCAR Cup Series
 2023 NASCAR Craftsman Truck Series
 2023 ARCA Menards Series
 2023 ARCA Menards Series East
 2023 ARCA Menards Series West
 2023 NASCAR Pinty's Series
 2023 NASCAR Whelen Euro Series
 2023 SRX Series

References

NASCAR Xfinity Series seasons
NASCAR
NASCAR Xfinity
NASCAR